Yolanda Moore (born July 1, 1974) is a former American professional basketball player. She was the post game radio analyst for the Memphis Grizzlies in 2007.

College playing career
Moore played basketball at University of Mississippi and was a three-time All-Southeastern Conference post player. In 2010, she was inducted into Ole Miss Sports Hall of Fame. She graduated from Mississippi in 1997 with a bachelor's degree with a double major in English and radio and television.

Pro playing career
Moore spent three years in the WNBA, a total of 66 games and 740 minutes of playing time. In 1997 and 1998 she won a WNBA Championship with the Houston Comets. In 1999 she played for the Orlando Miracle.

Coaching career
Moore became assistant boys' basketball coach and honors English teacher at DeSoto Central High School in Southaven, Mississippi near Memphis, Tennessee in 2007. In 2011, she was girls' basketball coach at Heritage Academy  in Columbus, Mississippi before being fired in December.

Louisiana State University at Eunice
Moore led the Lady Bengals to a 26-3 overall record. The team ranked sixth nationally in scoring defense.

Southeastern Louisiana University
In April 2014 Moore became the fifth head women's basketball coach for Southeastern Louisiana University. She continued in that role for two seasons, in which she had an 11–47 record.

Personal life
Moore has four children; she had her first child while attending the University of Mississippi. In addition to her undergraduate degree at Mississippi, Moore has a master's degree in workforce educational leadership from Alcorn State University and later enrolled at Mississippi State University to pursue a Ph.D. in instructional systems and workforce development.

Career statistics

Regular season

|-
| style="text-align:left;background:#afe6ba;"|1997†
| style="text-align:left;"|Houston
| 13 || 0 || 7.2 || .250 || — || .500 || 1.0 || 0.1 || 0.1 || 0.0 || 0.5 || 1.2
|-
| style="text-align:left;background:#afe6ba;"|1998†
| style="text-align:left;"|Houston
| 30 || 4 || 17.8 || .451 || .500 || .805 || 2.9 || 0.3 || 0.9 || 0.0 || 0.7 || 3.3
|-
| style="text-align:left;"|1999
| style="text-align:left;"|Orlando
| 23 || 0 || 5.0 || .476 || .000 || .500 || 0.6 || 0.0 || 0.2 || 0.0 || 0.6 || 1.1
|-
| style="text-align:left;"|Career
| style="text-align:left;"|3 years, 2 teams
| 66 || 4 || 11.2 || .420 || .333 || .692 || 1.7 || 0.2 || 0.5 || 0.0 || 0.6 || 2.1

Playoffs

|-
| style="text-align:left;background:#afe6ba;"|1997†
| style="text-align:left;"|Houston
| 1 || 0 || 3.0 || — || — || — || 0.0 || 0.0 || 0.0 || 0.0 || 0.0 ||0.0
|-
| style="text-align:left;background:#afe6ba;"|1998†
| style="text-align:left;"|Houston
| 5 || 0 || 12.2 || .667 || — || .333 || 1.8 || 0.0 || 0.8 || 0.0 || 0.2 || 4.2
|-
| style="text-align:left;"|Career
| style="text-align:left;"|2 years, 1 team
| 6 || 0 || 10.7 || .667 || — || .333 || 1.5 || 0.0 || 0.7 || 0.0 || 0.2 || 3.5

Head coaching record

Junior college

College

References

External links
Southeastern Louisiana Athletics - Staff Directory

 

1974 births
Living people
African-American basketball players
Alcorn State University alumni
American motivational speakers
Women motivational speakers
Basketball coaches from Mississippi
Basketball players from Mississippi
Guards (basketball)
High school basketball coaches in the United States
Houston Comets players
Junior college women's basketball coaches in the United States
Mississippi State University alumni
People from Port Gibson, Mississippi
Ole Miss Rebels women's basketball players
Orlando Miracle players
21st-century African-American sportspeople
21st-century African-American women
20th-century African-American sportspeople
20th-century African-American women
20th-century African-American people
Southeastern Louisiana Lady Lions basketball coaches
Clark Atlanta Panthers